Jeffrey Edward Fowle (born 1958) is an American citizen who was arrested during a vacation in North Korea in May 2014 for leaving a Bible in a club in the northern port city of Chongjin.

Personal life
Fowle is from Miamisburg, Ohio, and worked in the Moraine, Ohio municipal street department. His wife, Tatyana was born in Russia, and they have three children.

Arrest
In May 2014, Fowle was arrested while on a guided tour of North Korea after authorities discovered a Bible he had deliberately left behind in the restaurant toilet at the Chongjin Sailor's Club.  Religious proselytism is a crime in North Korea.  At the time, Fowle was one of three incarcerated Americans in North Korea. They were individually granted interviews with two U.S. news stations, CNN and Associated Press, pleading for assistance from the U.S. government.

Release
On October 21, 2014, Fowle was released and flown out of North Korea on a U.S. government jet. Sweden facilitated Fowle's release as the United States and North Korea did not have formal diplomatic relations.

References

2014 in North Korea
American people imprisoned abroad
Date of birth missing (living people)
People from Miamisburg, Ohio
Place of birth missing (living people)
American people imprisoned in North Korea
Living people
Christianity in North Korea
1958 births